A writing circle is a group of like-minded writers needing support for their work, either through writing peer critiques, workshops or classes, or just encouragement.  There are many different types of writing circles or writing groups based on location, style of writing, or format.  Normally, the goal of a writing circle is to improve one's own craft by listening to the works and suggestions of others in the group.  It also builds a sense of community, and allows new writers to become accustomed to sharing their work.  Writing circles can be helpful inside and outside of the classroom.

Function
A writing circle brings writers from different walks of life together in one place to discuss their work in a workshop style setting.  Writers will be able to give feedback and hear suggestions from fellow writers.  It can build community in a classroom and help students gain public speaking cleans.  This workshop method could be used for any genre of writing (creative prose, poetry, etc.).

Writing circles can build a sense of community and help writers become more confident in their own work. They teach writers how to give and receive constructive criticism, enable them to learn from one another's mistakes and successes, and let them appreciate different opinions and views. In some cases, writing circles can be used as a form of group therapy (writing for healing).

List of notable writing circles

Online
 Youwriteon
 The Pen Factor

United Kingdom
 Norwich Writers' Circle
 Oxford University Poetry Society
 Mitzi Szereto's workshop for Erotic fiction is held in various locations in the UK throughout the year.

United States
 Clarion Workshop
 Milford Writer's Workshop
 The Turkey City Writer's Workshop
 The Wordos Writer's Workshop
 Algonkian Writers Conference
 Sycamore Hill Writer's Workshop
 Iowa Writers' Workshop

References

External links

Circle